Girls Gone Mild: Young Women Reclaim Self-Respect and Find It's Not Bad to Be Good is a book by the American conservative writer Wendy Shalit published by Random House in 2007. The book is an investigation into an emerging new movement of young women rediscovering their capacity for innocence.

Critical reception for Girls Gone Mild has been mixed. Some positive reviews have praised Shalit for her message that girls can be modest in an over-sexualized society. As one reviewer notes, "Adults in authority—school administrators, commentators, and government officials—often seem to want teens to get only one side of the sexuality story. But girls need—and want—an alternative. In letting more and more young Americans know the alternative is out there."

Some have criticized Shalit's stance on modesty. Some argue that Shalit's argument implies that a girl's end goal is to remain modest for her ultimate end goal of marriage. Another critique is that Shalit appears to argue that women are responsible for men's behavior. As one critic notes, "Revamping outdated notions of femininity and positioning them as cutting edge may be a smart way to sell a glut of baggy bathing suits then, but it sure doesn't sound like a revolution."

References

External links 
 

2007 non-fiction books
American non-fiction books
English-language books